This is a list of notable Filipino beauty pageant winners who have represented the Philippines in various beauty pageants.

A 

Tetchie Agbayani
Carlene Aguilar
Sharifa Akeel
Naelah Alshorbaji
Richell Angalot
Ariella Arida
Hannah Arnold

B 

Roxanne Baeyens
Maricar Balagtas
Gabrielle Camille Basiano
Raine Baljak
Kirby Ann Basken
Leren Bautista
Samantha Bernardo
Nicole Borromeo

C 

Maria Teresa Carlson†
Ann Colis
Ginger Conejero
Nicole Cordoves
Celeste Cortesi
Gemma Cruz

D 

Mutya Johanna Datul
Isabelle de Leon
Trinidad de Leon†
Michelle Dee
Angelee delos Reyes
Gloria Diaz
Rio Diaz† 
Katrina Dimaranan
Alice Dixson

E 

Marilen Espino

F 

Patricia Fernandez
Trinidad Fernandez

G 

Karen Gallman
Gazini Ganados
Melody Gersbach†
Beatrice Gomez
Maita Gomez†
Charlene Gonzales
Catriona Gray
Michele Gumabao
Ruffa Gutierrez

H 

Jeanne Harn
Karla Henry
Jamie Herrell

I 

Karen Ibasco
Athena Imperial

K 

Maria Kalaw
Krista Kleiner
Ganiel Krishnan

L 

Mary Jean Lastimosa
Laura Lehmann
Maria Isabel Lopez
Janicel Lubina

M 

Nicole Magadia
Bea Magtanong
Bianca Manalo
Jessica Marasigan
Melanie Marquez
Paz Márquez
Teresita Marquez
Rabiya Mateo 
Christi McGarry
Koreen Medina
Maxine Medina
Feliza Teresa Miro
Maureen Montagne
Maricel Morales
Margarita Moran

N 

Dianne Necio

O 

Cinderella Obeñita
Angelia Ong

P 

Dindi Pajares
Hillarie Parungao
Evangeline Pascual
April Ross Perez
Tracy Perez
Rachel Peters
Aurora Pijuan
Pilar Pilapil
Carmen Planas

Q 

Diane Querrer
Miriam Quiambao
Precious Lara Quigaman
Jonavi Raisa Quiray R 

Venus Raj
Lia Ramos
Queenierich Rehman
Daisy Reyes
Nina Robertson
Katarina Rodriguez
Gwendoline Ruais
Vickie Rushton

 S 

Janina San MiguelBea SantiagoJoanne Santos
Riza Santos
Nicole Schmitz
Lorraine Schuck
Imelda Schweighart
Sandra SeifertSophia SenoronAurora Sevilla
Parul Shah
Tisha Silang
Rosario Silayan†
Stephany Stefanowitz
Shamcey Supsup
Tamera Szijarto

 T Francesca TarucEmma Tiglao
Janine Tugonon
Patricia Tumulak

 U 

Catherine Untalan

 V 

Wendy Valdez
Emmanuelle VeraKylie VerzosaPura Villanueva

 W 

Valerie Weigmann
Margaret Wilson
Elizabeth Winsett
Maureen WroblewitzPia Wurtzbach Y Megan Young'''

Gallery

References

Beauty pageants in the Philippines
Filipino beauty pageant winners

Beauty pageant winners
Beauty pageant winners
Beauty pageant winners